Crowville may refer to:

Crowville, Georgia
Crowville, Louisiana